Taft is a city in the Central District of Taft County, Yazd province, Iran, and serves as capital of the county. At the 2006 census, its population was 15,329 in 4,265 households. The following census in 2011 counted 15,717 people in 4,564 households. The latest census in 2016 showed a population of 18,464 people in 5,649 households.

History
In the 15th century, Taft was home to Sufi poet Shah Nimatullah Wali.

Following the Iranian Constitutional Revolution of 1906, a rebellion broke out in Taft, led by Mohammad Bana, who with his armed bandits briefly took over the government seat in Yazd. The rebellion was crushed in 1911 and Bana fled back to Taft.

Location
Taft is located 20 kilometers southwest of the city of Yazd and is located at an altitude of 1,560 meters.

Gallery

References 

Taft County

Cities in Yazd Province

Populated places in Yazd Province

Populated places in Taft County